Petreni may refer to:

Villages in Romania
 Petreni, a village in Bucium, Alba
 Petreni, a village in Mărtiniș Commune, Harghita County
 Petreni, a village in Băcia Commune, Hunedoara County

Commune in Moldova
 Petreni, Drochia

See also
 Petre (disambiguation)
 Petrești (disambiguation)
 Petreasa (disambiguation)